Altaghoney is townland of 1,163 acres in County Londonderry, Northern Ireland. It is situated in the civil parish of Cumber Upper and the historic barony of Tirkeeran.

Archaeology
Altaghoney contains a stone circle at grid ref: C515013. It also contains a cross at grid ref: C5371 0192 which is registered as a Scheduled Historic Monument.

See also 
List of townlands in County Londonderry

References 

Townlands of County Londonderry
Civil parish of Cumber Upper